Jeff Ferguson may refer to:

 Jeff Ferguson (basketball) (born 1981), Canadian basketball player 
 Jeff Ferguson (ice hockey) (born 1969), Canadian ice hockey and roller hockey goaltender 
 Jeff Ferguson, American college football punter on the List of Oklahoma Sooners football All-Americans
 Jeff Ferguson, American film producer of The Zombie Chronicles